The 2016–17 Women's Volleyball Thailand League  was the 12th season of the Thai League, the top Thai professional league for association volleyball clubs, since its establishment in 2005. A total of 8 teams competed in the league. The season started on 29 October 2016.

Bangkok Glass are the defending champions, having won the Volleyball Thailand League title the previous season.

Teams

Stadiums and locations

Name changes
Idea Khonkaen renamed themselves to Khonkaen Star.

Personnel and sponsoring

Foreign players and Domestic Players

Tournament format
First round: single round-robin.
Second round: single round-robin.

Season standing procedure
 Number of matches won
 Match points
 Sets ratio
 Points ratio
 Result of the last match between the tied teams

Match won 3–0 or 3–1: 3 match points for the winner, 0 match points for the loser
Match won 3–2: 2 match points for the winner, 1 match point for the loser

Regular season

League table

Result table

Results

First round

Second round

Final standing

Awards

Most Valuable Player
  Ajcharaporn Kongyot (Supreme Chonburi)
Best Opposite Spiker
  Fatou Diouck (Supreme Chonburi)
Best Outside Spikers
  Ajcharaporn Kongyot (Supreme Chonburi)
  Wilavan Apinyapong (Supreme Chonburi)

Best Middle Blockers
   Thatdao Nuekjang (Khonkaen Star)
   Pleumjit Thinkaow (Bangkok Glass)
Best Setter
  Soraya Phomla (Supreme Chonburi)
Best Libero
  Supattra Pairoj (Supreme Chonburi)

See also 
 2016–17 Men's Volleyball Thailand League

References

2016
Thailand League
Volleyball,Thailand League
Volleyball,Thailand League